Post Falls High School is a public secondary school in located in Post Falls, Idaho. Established in 1912, the current campus of PFHS opened  in 2000; it is the only traditional high school in the Post Falls School District. After four failed bond attempts, the $18 million levy passed by two votes in March 1998. The school colors are black and orange and the mascot is a Trojan.

Athletics
PFHS competes in IHSAA Class 5A with the largest schools in the state in the Inland Empire League (5A) with nearby and Coeur d'Alene and Lake City, and also Lewiston, about two hours south. Post Falls moved  up to 5A from 4A in the fall of 2006; it had moved from A-2 to A-1 (Division II) in the fall of 1985.

State titles

Boys
 Soccer (1): fall (5A) 2012 
 Basketball (4): (AA) 1963; (A-3, now 2A) 1964, (5A) 2010 (5A) 2015 
 Track (1): (A-2, now 3A) 1971 
 Wrestling (4):(5A) 2015, 2016, 2018, 2019, 2020

Girls
 Basketball (5): (A-2, now 3A) 1983; (4A) 2002, 2003, 2013, 2018 (introduced in 1976)
 Track (1): (B, now 3A) 1973  (introduced in 1971)

Notable alumni
Jeremy Gable, playwright and game designer
Brad Lebo, football player
Rollin Putzier, football player
Joe Tofflemire, football player
Ian Waltz, American discus thrower

References

External links
 Post Falls High School
 Post Falls School District #273

Public high schools in Idaho
Post Falls, Idaho
Schools in Kootenai County, Idaho
1912 establishments in Idaho
Educational institutions established in 1912